This is a list of members of the Victorian Legislative Council, as appointed to the Council of 1853 or elected at the 1853 election (main table). Members added in 1855 are noted in a separate section below.

From 1851 to 1856 the original Legislative Council was unicameral (a single chamber) and consisted of Electoral districts.
From 1856 onwards, the Victorian parliament consisted of two houses, the Victorian Legislative Council (upper house, consisting of Provinces) and the Victorian Legislative Assembly (lower house).

Note the "Term in Office" refers to that members term(s) in the Council, not necessarily for that electorate.

Aldcorn resigned 24 November 1853; replaced by James McCulloch (non-office-bearing nominee) from 1 August 1854
Annand resigned July 1855; replaced by Thomas Embling, by-election Sep. 1855
Campbell resigned May 1854; replaced by Thomas Howard Fellows, by-election Sep. 1854
Childers was Auditor-General until 5 December 1853 replaced by Edward Grimes from 8 December 1853. Childers was Collector of Customs from 5 December 1853
Cole resigned May 1855; replaced by John King by-election Nov. 1855
Cowie resigned May 1854, replaced by James Harrison, by-election Nov. 1854
Croke resigned January 1854, replaced by Robert Molesworth from 4 January 1854
Dane resigned November 1854; replaced by Henry Samuel Chapman, by-election Feb. 1855
Emmett resigned September 1853; replaced by Andrew Knight on 6 September 1853; Knight resigned 8 March 1854; replaced by Charles Bradshaw on 1 August 1854
Foster resigned December 1854, replaced by William Haines as Colonial Secretary on 12 December 1854
Goldsmith resigned November 1853, replaced by John Thompson Charlton
Graham resigned July 1854, replaced by Donald Kennedy from September 1854
Haines resigned Dec. 1854; replaced by Horatio Wills, January 1855
Langlands was unseated; replaced by successful appealer Frederick James Sargood, Oct. 1853
Mitchell resigned November 1853, replaced by Charles MacMahon
James Murphy resigned Sep. 1855; replaced by Thomas Rae by-election Nov. 1855
Nicholson resigned May 1854; replaced by George Horne, by-election Sep. 1854
Parker resigned August 1854; replaced by Alfred Ross 12 August 1854
Pohlman resigned as nominee October 1854, elected for Ripon and Hampden, Grenville and Polwarth, January 1855.   Pohlman replaced   by Charles Pasley (Colonial Engineer) in the Council on 16 October 1854
Rutledge resigned Mar. 1854; replaced by Claud Farie, by-election Apr. 1854, resigned Oct. 1885; replaced by James M. Knight, by-election, Dec. 1855
Splatt resigned Apr. 1854; replaced by William Taylor, by-election Sep. 1854
Stevens resigned Feb. 1854; replaced by Francis Beaver, by-election Mar. 1854
Alexander Thomson resigned Aug. 1955; replaced by Alexander Fyfe, by-election Sep. 1854
James Thomson resigned Feb. 1854; replaced by Colin Campbell, by-election 1854
Winter resigned Aug. 1854; replaced by William Forlonge, by-election, Oct. 1854

Members from 1855
In 1855, five new electorates were created, a total of eight elected members and one non-office bearing nominee were added to the Council.  Nominations took place on 10 November 1855, Humffray and Lalor were elected unopposed. An office-bearing nominee (Treasurer) was added 28 November 1855.

References

Members of the Parliament of Victoria by term
19th-century Australian politicians